The 2016–17 TCU Horned Frogs women's basketball team represents Texas Christian University in the 2016–17 NCAA Division I women's basketball season. The 2016–17 season was head coach Raegan Pebley's third season at TCU.  The Horned Frogs were members of the Big 12 Conference and played their home games in Schollmaier Arena. They finished the season 12–18, 4–14 in Big 12 play to finish in ninth place. They lost in the first round of the Big 12 women's tournament to Texas Tech.

Roster

Schedule and results 

|-
!colspan=9 style="background:#4d1979; color:#FFFFFF;"| Exhibition

|-
!colspan=9 style="background:#4d1979; color:#FFFFFF;"| Non-Conference Games

|-
!colspan=9 style="background:#4d1979; color:#FFFFFF;"| Conference Games

|-
!colspan=9 style="background:#4d1979; color:#FFFFFF;"|  Big 12 Women's Tournament

Schedule and results from GoFrogs.com

See also 
 2016–17 TCU Horned Frogs men's basketball team

References 

TCU
TCU Horned Frogs women's basketball seasons